Unhoused may refer to:
 the state of homelessness
 Unhoused.org, an anti-homeless non-profit